Haren S. Gandhi (May 2, 1941 – January 23, 2010) was an American inventor and engineer, a recipient of the U.S. National Medal of Technology and Innovation, noted for his research and inventions in the field of automotive exhaust catalysts.

Gandhi was elected to the National Academy of Engineering in 1999 "for contributions to the research and development of automotive catalysts".
Gandhi held 61 U.S. patents.
He was also the director of chemical engineering and a Henry Ford Technical Fellow at the Ford Motor Company.

President George W. Bush presented Gandhi with the National Medal of Technology and Innovation at the White House in 2003.
The National Academy of Engineering called Gandhi "one of the world's foremost authorities in the area of automotive emissions control".

Chronology 

 1941: born on May 2 in Calcutta, India as Harendra Sakarlal Gandhi 
 1963: first class honours degree from the Department of Chemical Technology at the University of Bombay (now ICT Mumbai)
 1967: joins Ford Motor Company as a research scientist
 1967: M.S., the University of Detroit
 1971: Ph.D. in Chemical Engineering, the University of Detroit
 1999: elected to the National Academy of Engineering
 2003: George W. Bush's the National Medal of Technology and Innovation
 2010: died on January 23

Legacy  
In 2010 the Ford Motor Company introduced the Haren Gandhi Research and Innovation Award in his honor for his contributions in the field of automotive exhaust catalysts and as one of its employees. It is awarded annually by Ford to members of its staff as the company's highest technical award, given to outstanding technical individuals for their significant contributions in their field of study. Award winners: Vasiliy Krivtsov (2021), Gopichandra Surnilla (2020), Saeed Barbat (2019), Suzhou Huang (2019), Mrdjan Jankovic (2018), Pete Friedman (2017), Jeff Greenburg (2016), Debbie Mielewski (2015), Elizabeth Baron (2014), Louis Tijerina (2013), Tim Wallington (2011), and Dimitar Filev (2010).

References 

Ford people
Scientists from Kolkata
1941 births
2010 deaths
University of Detroit Mercy alumni
University of Mumbai alumni
Institute of Chemical Technology alumni
Members of the United States National Academy of Engineering
Indian emigrants to the United States
American inventors
American engineers
National Medal of Technology recipients
Industry and corporate fellows